City Life is the first studio album by American rap group Boogie Boys, released on February 18, 1985 by Capitol Records. The album peaked at No. 53 on the Billboard 200. The album had a major hit in America with the single "A Fly Girl."

"A Fly Girl"
As one of the first rap groups to sign with a major label, the Boogie Boys were under pressure to create a fresh, new sound. Capitol wanted to release "City Life" as their first single as they felt it would have broader appeal, especially since the song combined rapping and singing. But the Boogie Boys felt "A Fly Girl" would have more impact.

Boogie Boys member Joe "Romeo J.D." Malloy:

Track listing
 Runnin' From Your Love (4:58)
 Do or Die (4:52)
 Break Dancer (3:23)
 A Fly Girl (5:51)
 City Life (4:55)
 Party Asteroid (5:26)
 You Ain't Fresh (3:50)
 Shake and Break (3:51)

Personnel
 William "Boogie Knight" Stroman – vocals
 Joe "Romeo J.D." Malloy – vocals
 Rudy "Lil' Rahiem" Sheriff – vocals
 David Spradley – producer
 Ted Currier – producer
 Bob Rosa – engineer
 Steve Peck – engineer

References 

1985 debut albums
Boogie Boys albums
Capitol Records albums